Suzuka may refer to:
Suzuka (beetle), a genus of beetles in the family Carabidae
Suzuka (manga), a Japanese manga and anime series
Suzuka Mountains
Suzuka, Mie, a city in Mie Prefecture, Japan
Suzuka Circuit, a race track
1000km Suzuka, a sports car race
Suzuka 8 Hours, a motorcycle race
Suzuka 8 Hours (arcade game)
"Twilight" Suzuka, a character from the Outlaw Star series
Suzuka, a character from the Angelic Layer series
Suzuka, a character from the YuYu Hakusho series
Suzuka Gozen a figure in Japanese folklore
Suzuka Mambo a Thoroughbred racehorse
Silence Suzuka Japanese Thoroughbred racehorse

People
Suzuka (written: 鈴鹿, 涼香, 涼風, 涼夏, すず香, or すずか in hiragana) is a feminine Japanese given name. Notable people with the name include:

Suzuka Hasegawa (born 2000), Japanese swimmer
,  Japanese actress and voice actress
Suzuka Nakamoto (born 1997), also known as Su-metal or simply Suzuka
, Japanese actress
, Japanese ice hockey player
Suzuka Tomita (born 2001), Japanese singer and television personality
, Japanese voice actress
, Japanese photographer
, Japanese actress

See also
Suzaka, Nagano, a city in Nagano Prefecture, Japan
Suzuki (disambiguation)
Suzaku (disambiguation)

Japanese feminine given names
Japanese-language surnames